Arrow High School is a public continuation high school in the Charter Oak Unified School District. It is located in the City of Glendora, California, in the San Gabriel Valley east of Los Angeles. The school serves 10th, 11th and 12th graders in the communities of Covina, Glendora and San Dimas who are deficient in credits needed to graduate high school. Arrow High School is accredited by the Western Association of Schools and Colleges.  It was named a Model Continuation High School by the California Continuation Education Association   in 2015.

References

Glendora, California
High schools in Los Angeles County, California
Public high schools in California
 Continuation high schools in California